Lawley is an unincorporated community in Bibb County, Alabama, United States.

History
The community has a post office, with postmasters appointed from 1955 to 2005.

Geography

References

Unincorporated communities in Alabama
Unincorporated communities in Bibb County, Alabama